Nereis sandersi is a species of sandworm in the family Nereididae.

References

Phyllodocida
Articles created by Qbugbot
Insects described in 1985